MTV Sports: Pure Ride is a snowboarding video game developed by Radical Entertainment and Visual Impact and published by THQ for the PlayStation and Game Boy Color in 2000.

Gameplay
This game has a fair number of game modes and level types available, including Slopestyle mode; a tour challenge where the player can compete in all-new half-pipes and other events to unlock goodies; an exclusive stunt mode where the player can combine jumps, tricks, and grinds; and the Build a Mountain mode where players can place cars, trees, and rails in three diverse environments. There are also songs in the game soundtrack, including "Privilege" by Incubus.

Reception

The PlayStation version received "average" reviews according to the review aggregation website Metacritic.

Notes

References

External links
 
 

2000 video games
Game Boy Color games
MTV video games
PlayStation (console) games
Radical Entertainment games
Snowboarding video games
THQ games
Video games developed in Canada
Video games scored by Marc Baril